Baketopia is an American streaming reality television series hosted by Rosanna Pansino. The series premiered on HBO Max on March 25, 2021, and consisted of 12 episodes. The series was canceled due to the upcoming merger of HBO Max and Discovery+.

Premise 
Rosanna Pansino creates challenges that bakers must complete.

Each episode focuses around two baking challenges, called "tiers", in which the contestants compete to create desserts according to the challenge's rules. The winner of the first tier receives $1,000 and a gold brooch portraying a rolling pin. 

The second tier always focuses on cakes. The winner receives $10,000 and a trophy.

Cast 
Rosanna Pansino hosted and judged. Donal Skehan and Timbo Sullivan also appeared.

Episodes 
The winners of the first tier competition are listed italic. The winners of the second tier are listed in bold.

Season 1 (2021)

Cancellation 
Bloomberg in 2022 reported that the show and its sister show Craftopia were canceled and removed from HBO Max due to the expected 2023 merger of HBO Max and Discovery+.

International broadcast 
In Canada, the series premiered on Family Channel on June 14, 2021.

References

External links 

2020s American reality television series
2020s American cooking television series
2021 American television series debuts
2021 American television series endings
Food reality television series
English-language television shows
HBO Max original programming